Life After Life may refer to:

Literature
Life After Life (Moody book), a 1975 book about near-death experiences by Raymond Moody
Life After Life, a 2006 book about prison release by Norman Parker
Life After Life (novel), a 2013 novel by Kate Atkinson

Music
Life After Life (band), a 1990s punk band
Life after Life (生生世世), a 1995 album by Sun Nan
Life After Life (Жизнь после жизни), a 1996 album by AVIA
"Life After Life" (1978 song), a song by Mark Perry
"Life After Life" (1994 song), a song by Ronnie Montrose off the album Music from Here
"Life After Life" (2001 song), a song from Dracula, the Musical
"Life After Life" (2014 song), a song by The Pains of Being Pure at Heart off the album Days of Abandon

Film
Life After Life (再生人) (1981 film), an award-winning Hong Kong film, winning at the 2nd Hong Kong Film Awards
Chances Are (film), a 1989 film that was known while under production as Life After Life
Life After Life (1992 film), a film by Peter Shockey
 Iyore (aka The Return: Life After Life) 2014 Nigerian drama film
Life After Life (2015 film), an award-winning student film, winning at the 2016 40th Hong Kong International Film Festival

Other uses
Life After Life (radio play), a 2011 radio drama by Toby Swift
"Life After Life" (1980 TV episode), a 1980 episode of In Search of... (TV series)
"Life After Life" (2014 TV episode), a 2014 episode of Holby City
Life After Life (TV series), a 2022 series based on the Kate Atkinson novel of the same name

See also

Life after death (disambiguation)
after death (disambiguation)
afterlife (disambiguation)
Life Before Life a 2005 book by Jim B. Tucker